Raimondo Ponte (born 4 April 1955) is a Swiss former professional footballer. At international level, he made 34 appearances for the Swiss national team scoring 2 goals.

Career
Ponte joined Nottingham Forest from Grasshopper Club Zürich for the 1980–81 season and made 21 league appearances for Forest, before moving to play for French club SC Bastia.

References

External links
 
 
 Raimondo Ponte at Weltfussball.de  

1955 births
Living people
People from Brugg District
Association football forwards
Swiss men's footballers
Switzerland international footballers
Swiss expatriate footballers
Swiss Super League players
English Football League players
Ligue 1 players
FC Aarau players
Grasshopper Club Zürich players
Nottingham Forest F.C. players
SC Bastia players
Expatriate footballers in England
Expatriate footballers in France
Swiss expatriate sportspeople in England
Swiss expatriate sportspeople in France
Swiss football managers
FC Zürich managers
SC Young Fellows Juventus managers
FC Luzern managers
FC Chiasso managers
AC Bellinzona managers
FC Lugano managers
FC Wohlen managers
FC Baden managers
FC Aarau managers
Sportspeople from Aargau